The 1989 season of the African Cup Winners' Cup football club tournament was won by Al Merreikh in two-legged final victory against Bendel United F.C. This was the fifteenth season that the tournament took place for the winners of each African country's domestic cup. Thirty-three sides entered the competition, with UDIB, Al Ahly (Tripoli) and Nakivubo Villa SC all withdrawing before the 1st leg of the first round.

Preliminary round

|}

First round

|}

1: UDIB withdrew.
2: Al-Ahly withdrew.
3: ASF Bobo won on away goals.
4: Nakivubo Villa withdrew.

Second round

|}

1: Union d'Alger won 4-3 PSO.

Quarter-finals

|}

1: USM Alger withdrew after the first leg.

Semifinals

|}

Final

|}

Champions

Notes

External links
 Results available on CAF Official Website
 Results available on RSSSF

African Cup Winners' Cup
2